Old Newton is a village in the Mid Suffolk district of Suffolk in eastern England. Located within the civil parish of Old Newton with Dagworth, the village is situated around two miles north of Stowmarket, to the east of the junction of the Great Eastern Main Line and the Ipswich to Ely Line. Until the Beeching Axe it was served by Haughley railway station. In 2018 it had an estimated population of 809.

References

Old Newton and Dagworth Council website
The History of Dagworth website
 Stowmarket Sport (Grassroots coverage of sports, clubs and teams in a three-mile radius of Stowmarket)

Villages in Suffolk
Mid Suffolk District